Semih Çalışkan (born 10 January 1986, İstanbul ) is a Turkish best-selling book author. Çalışkan published his first book A Bar Philosopher in October 2015 and it became a national bestseller. His second book 94 will be out in 2020.

Biography 
Çalışkan was born on 10 January 1986 in Istanbul. After graduating from Pertevniyal High School, he studied chemistry at Boğaziçi University. During his time at university, he attended screenwriting courses at Mithat Alam Cinema Centre for two years. He has worked for multinational advertising agencies and FMCG companies. Now, Çalışkan works as the CEO of ÇapaMarka Entertainment Group.

Çalışkan's first novel, A Bar Philosopher is a love story based on a true story. Ayşe Arman describes him as an 'author entrepreneur'. The cover of the book "A Bar Philosopher" was designed by Emrah Yucel. Moreover, for the book launch, Çalışkan produced short movies in which Gupse Ozay stars. Those short movies were screened for the first time, in Okan Bayulgen's late night show Dada Dandanista.

Çalışkan is now working on tv-series adaptations, and international editions of his first book A Bar Philosopher and new book 94.

Bibliography  
 A Bar Philosopher (Bir Bar Filozofu), 2015, Dogan,

External links 
 Semih Çalışkan's official Website
Semih Çalışkan's Twitter
Semih Çalışkan's Instagram

References

Living people
1986 births
Writers from Istanbul
Pertevniyal High School alumni
Boğaziçi University alumni
Turkish novelists